The 4th Kuwaiti Federation Cup started on 5 September 2010.

The fourth Federation Cup is one of four competitions in the Kuwaiti 2010/2011 season. Fourteen clubs are taking part in the tournament.

They were divided into two groups of seven, and the winner and runner-up of each group will advance to the semi-finals.

Group stage

Group 1

Group 2

1 It is unclear why Al Sahel did not take their place in the semi-final stages after qualifying, although it is not uncommon in Kuwaiti football competitions for teams to withdraw at certain stages of tournaments.

Semi-finals

Final

Kuwait Federation Cup
2010–11 domestic association football cups
2010–11 in Kuwaiti football